...Spasming and Howling, Bowels Loosening and Bladders Emptying, Vomiting Helplessly... is a compilation album by Gnaw Their Tongues, independently released in August 2007. Intended as an entry point into the project's music until that point, the album comprises three previously released and three previously unreleased compositions.

Track listing

Personnel
Adapted from the ...Spasming and Howling, Bowels Loosening and Bladders Emptying, Vomiting Helplessly... liner notes.
 Maurice de Jong (as Mories) – vocals, instruments, recording, cover art

Release history

References

External links 
 

2007 compilation albums
Gnaw Their Tongues albums